Navid Khosh Hava (20 July 19914 December 2021) was an Iranian professional footballer who played as a defender.

Club career
Khosh Hava made his debut against Rah Ahan coming on as an 88th-minute substitute for Farzad Hatami. In the following match, a 2–2 draw with Saipa, he Hava scored a goal in the 50th minute.

On 30 November 2014, Khosh Hava joined Rah Ahan.

Khosh Hava signed with Peykan in 2015. He left the club in January 2016 to join Pas Hamadan.

Death
Khosh Hava died following a cardiac arrest on 4 December 2021, at the age of 30.

References

External links
 

1991 births
2021 deaths
People from Ardabil
Iranian footballers
Association football defenders
Tractor S.C. players
Shahrdari Ardabil players
Rah Ahan players
Paykan F.C. players
PAS Hamedan F.C. players